Branca is a village and a civil parish of the municipality of Albergaria-a-Velha, Portugal. The population in 2011 was 5,621, in an area of 	30.29 km2.

References

Freguesias of Albergaria-a-Velha